Prosopocoilus inclinatus, the Japanese stag beetle or Kawagatamushi is a beetle of the Family Lucanidae found in Hokkaido, Honshu, Shikoku, Kyushu, Sado Island, Tsushima, Yaku Island, and the Korean peninsula. Their common, English name is derived from the shape of their mandibles, which resemble the antlers of a stag. It is a popular children's pet in Japan.

Description
Japanese stag beetles are large, smooth, dark brown to red brown beetles, measuring 25 to 75 mm in length. Males are larger than the females and have mandibles which are enlarged and much longer than the female's.

References

Lucaninae
Prosopocoilus